The 2021 ELF season is the inaugural season of the European League of Football, a newly formed professional American football league based in Europe. It started on June 19, 2021, and ended with a Championship Game in Düsseldorf's Merkur Spiel-Arena, on September 26, 2021.

Format 
The league is divided into two divisions, North and South. Each team plays 10 games during the regular season: twice against their division rivals, and twice against two of the teams from the other division. The top two teams in each division qualify for the playoffs, with the North and South champions qualifying for the Championship Game.

Rules 
For the inaugural season, the ELF is mostly using adapted NFL rules, as opposed to adapted NCAA rules which virtually all other European American Football leagues use. There is a limit of two "Americans" (a category which also includes some other non-European nationalities) per down but people who are dual citizens of the U.S. and a EU-member country are not counted towards that limit in keeping with the Bosman ruling. Unlike in most other European American football leagues there is overtime during regular season games that are still tied after regulation, but the overtime rules are based on NCAA rules.

Teams

Coaching changes

Salaries 
For its first season, the league pays a salary to American "import" players that generally ranges from €600 (around $700) to €3,000 ($3,500) per month, and provides housing, health insurance and two meals per day to players during the season. Despite claims to the contrary by the league, most "local" players did not get paid during the 2021 season.

Regular season

Standings

Results

Playoffs

Divisional playoffs

South: Frankfurt Galaxy 36, Cologne Centurions 6

North: Hamburg Sea Devils 30, Wrocław Panthers 27

Championship Game 

The inaugural Championship Game, between the North and South division champions, was played on September 26, at Merkur Spiel-Arena in Düsseldorf. In a game in which the lead changed more than once, Frankfurt, not confident enough of the quality of their placekicker, opted for two-point conversions after every single touchdown (only one out of five being successful), and not attempting a single field goal. Meanwhile, Hamburg's kicker Phillip Friis Andersen, who led the league in successful attempts during the regular season and won "Special Teams Player of the year", missed 2 FG attempts, including one from 61 yards on the last play, that could have won the game for Hamburg.

The Championship MVP trophy was won by Frankfurt QB Jakeb Sullivan, who passed for 324 yards, with 4 TD and no interceptions, and added another rushing TD.

Hamburg Sea Devils 30, Frankfurt Galaxy 32

All-Star Game 

The inaugural All-Star Game was held one week after the end of the season, on October 3 (the Day of German Unity), at Friedrich-Ludwig-Jahn-Sportpark in Berlin. It will feature a selection of the best players from the ELF, playing against the United States Federation of American Football All-Stars.

Attendance 

Games without fans are not counted in averages or games played. All teams started the season with capacity restrictions, due to the COVID-19 pandemic.

Awards

MVP of the Week

Honors for the season

On 1. October 2021 the "ELF Honors" were presented at RCADIA Hotel in Hamburg. The following players received the awards mentioned below:
 Most Valuable Player: Madre London, Running back, Cologne Centurions
 Offensive Player of the Year: Jakeb Sullivan, Quarterback, Frankfurt Galaxy
 Defensive Player of the Year: Kyle Kitchens, Defensive End, Leipzig Kings
 Special Teams Player of the Year: Phillip Friis Andersen, Kicker / Punter, Hamburg Sea Devils
 Rookie of the Year: Louis Geyer, Wide Receiver, Stuttgart Surge
 Coach of the Year: Thomas Kösling, Head coach, Frankfurt Galaxy
 Offensive Rookie of the Year: Gerald Ameln, Running back, Frankfurt Galaxy
 Defensive Rookie of the Year: Marcel Dabo, Cornerback, Stuttgart Surge
 Assistant Coach of the Year: Kendral Ellison, Defensive Coordinator, Hamburg Sea Devils
 Man of Honor: Jan Weinreich, Quarterback, Cologne Centurions

Statistical leaders

Signees to other professional leagues 
The following players invited to the NFL’s International Combine, assigned to NFL's International Player Pathway Program (IPPP), signed or drafted by CFL team or signed with USFL team following their involvement with The ELF in 2021:

NFL

CFL 
The following players signed with a CFL team:

The following players got drafted in the CFL's Global draft:

USFL

Broadcasting

Notes

References 

ELF
ELF
European League of Football seasons